The 2009 African Women's Handball Champions League was the 31st edition, organized by the African Handball Confederation, under the auspices of the International Handball Federation, the handball sport governing body. The tournament was held from October 21–30 at the Palais des Sports in Yaoundé, Cameroon, contested by 8 teams and won by Atlético Petróleos de Luanda of Angola.

Draw

Preliminary round

Times given below are in WAT UTC+1.

Group A

* Note:  Advance to semi-finals

Group B

* Note:  Advance to semi-finals

Knockout stage
Championship bracket

5-8th bracket

Final ranking

References

External links
 Official website

African Women's Handball Champions League
African Women's Handball Champions League
African Women's Handball Champions League
2009 Africa Women's Handball Champions League
Women's handball in Cameroon
African Women's Handball Champions League
Events in Yaoundé